In Tolkien's legendarium, ancestry provides a guide to character. The apparently genteel Hobbits of the Baggins family turn out to be worthy protagonists of The Hobbit and The Lord of the Rings. Bilbo Baggins is seen from his family tree to be both a Baggins and an adventurous Took. Similarly, Frodo Baggins has relatively outlandish Brandybuck blood. Among the Elves of Middle-earth, the highest are those whose ancestors conformed most closely to the divine will, migrating to Aman and seeing the light of the Two Trees of Valinor. Among Men, the heroic Aragorn is shown by his descent from Kings, Elves, and an immortal Maia to be of royal blood, destined to be the true King who will restore his people. Scholars have commented that in this way, Tolkien was presenting Anglo-Saxon views of kingship, though others have called his implied views racist.

Context 

J. R. R. Tolkien was an English author and philologist of ancient Germanic languages, specialising in Old English, the language of the Anglo-Saxons; he spent much of his career as a professor at the University of Oxford. He is best known for his novels about his invented Middle-earth, The Hobbit and The Lord of the Rings, and for the posthumously published The Silmarillion which provides a more mythical narrative about earlier ages. He invented several peoples for Middle-earth, including Elves, Dwarves, Hobbits, Orcs, Trolls, and Eagles, among others.

Family trees  

Tolkien's Middle-earth family trees have multiple functions, one being to show how different ancestries, and hence in Tolkien's view different aspects of character, come together in his protagonists. The Tolkien scholar Jason Fisher explains that Bilbo Baggins, for instance, was born to a genteel Baggins and an adventurous Took, while his cousin (often familiarly described as his nephew) and heir Frodo was the child of a Baggins and a relatively outlandish Brandybuck.

Sundering of the Elves 

In the long and complex process of the Sundering of the Elves, Tolkien consistently shows that the highest Elves are those who deviated least from their initial state (complying with the will of the Valar, travelling to Valinor, and continuing to speak the highest language, Quenya). Conversely, the lowest Elves, the Avari, fragmented into many kindreds with different languages as they eventually spread out across Middle-earth. The Tolkien scholars Tom Shippey and Verlyn Flieger both note that Tolkien thus intended ancestry to be a guide to character. The differences between the various Elvish languages mirror both the Sundering and the events of The Silmarillion. 

Shippey writes that The Silmarillion echoes Norse mythology in this belief, and that one perhaps needs to study the family trees to see clearly how it all works:

Aragorn's royal blood-line 

The hero Aragorn appears as a Man, and is described as such with the epithet Dúnadan, "Man of the West". His blood is however richer than that, as he can trace his ancestry back to the marriage of Eärendil and Elwing, both half-Elven and thus higher than mortal Men. Further, Elwing's ancestry goes back to the marriage of Thingol, the Elven King of Doriath, and Melian, a Maia or immortal spirit, one of the angelic Ainur. As far as his Elven pedigree is concerned, he was not only of the Teleri ("Those who come last") via Thingol; Eärendil was descended via Idril Celebrindal from Finwë of the Noldor ("Deep Elves") and Indis of the Vanyar ("The Fair"). These two groups were the highest of the Elves, and unlike the Teleri kept the faith by migrating all the way to Aman and thus saw the light of the Two Trees of Valinor. 

The Tolkien scholar Angela Nicholas argues that Aragorn's combined Man, Elf, and Maia ancestry "infuses divinity into his character." Judy Ann Ford and Robin Anne Reid write in Tolkien Studies that while the destruction of the One Ring prevents Sauron from taking over the whole of Middle-earth, the "true king", Aragorn, is required "to restore the world of men to its former glory." Aragorn has this destiny in his epithets, "for in the high tongue of old [Quenya] I am Elessar, the Elfstone, and Envinyatar, the Renewer'". Ford and Reid comment that Tolkien has made Aragorn conforms to the Anglo-Saxon ideal of kingship, noting that their kings "claimed descent from [the god] Woden", and further that "This divine ancestry was believed to endow royal blood with a portion of divine wisdom and supernatural power."

In his 2022 book Tolkien, Race, and Racism in Middle-earth, Robert Stuart on the other hand describes Tolkien's emphasis on Aragorn's ancestry as "aristocratic racism", likening Tolkien's implied views on race to those of the French 19th century diplomat Arthur de Gobineau, which he characterises as "anti-democratic, anti-national and, above all, anti-modern".

Notes

References

Primary 
This list identifies each item's location in Tolkien's writings.

Secondary

Sources 

 
 
 
 
 
 
 
 
 
 

Themes of The Lord of the Rings